The Clarion Project (formerly Clarion Fund Inc.) is an American nonprofit organization based in Washington, D.C. that was founded in 2006. The organization has been involved in the production and distribution of the films Obsession: Radical Islam's War Against the West, The Third Jihad: Radical Islam's Vision For America, Iranium, and Honor Diaries. These films have been criticized by some for allegedly falsifying information and described as anti-Muslim propaganda.

Mission and Leadership

Clarion Project states its mission is to expose and reduce the threats of extremism to create a safer world for all. The CEO as of 2022 is Richard Green. The project's advisory board included Raheel Raza president of Muslims Facing Tomorrow, Zuhdi Jasser president of the American Islamic Forum for Democracy (AIFD)  and Michelle Baron. The project was founded by Raphael Shore.

Funding 
The nonprofit Charity Navigator has rated the Clarion Project 2 out of 4 stars. According to the Clarion Project's Form 990, (2019), 70.2% of its expenses are program expenses, 12.4% are administrative, and 17.2% are for fundraising. Funders include the Donors Capital Fund, a nonprofit donor-advised fund, which gave the organization a donation of $17.7 million in 2008.

Criticism 
The Southern Poverty Law Center listed the organization as an "anti-Muslim hate group" in 2016-2019. The U.S.-based Muslim advocacy group, the Council on American–Islamic Relations, stated that the Clarion Project is among 37 American organizations that promote Islamophobia in America society. The organization has been described as part of the counter-jihad movement.

Clarion previously employed security-analyst Ryan Mauro, who according to the Southern Poverty Law Center, has asserted that there were multiple "no-go zones" for non-Muslims across the U.K. and Europe and has spoken about the supposed rising number of Muslim enclaves across the U.S., governed by "gangs of Islamic extremists" enforcing the Shariah law.
	
The Clarion Project's 2008 distribution of 28 million copies of its Obsession DVD right before the Presidential election has helped increase Islamophobia in the United States according to both Muslim and anti-Muslim  organizations. In 2022 a speech by a Clarion Project co-founder was cancelled.

Films 
 Obsession: Radical Islam's War Against the West (2005)
 The Third Jihad: Radical Islam's Vision For America (2008)
 Iranium (2011) - about Iran's nuclear weapons program
 Honor Diaries (2013) - about violence against women
 Faithkeepers (2017) - about Christians in the Middle East
 Kids: Chasing Paradise (2019) - about child soldiers
 Covert Cash (2020) - about foreign funding of US colleges

References

External links
 Clarion Project web site

Non-profit organizations based in Washington, D.C.
2006 establishments in Washington, D.C.
Organizations established in 2006
Counter-jihad